Kitty or Kittie is a feminine given name.

People
Kali Troy or Kittie (born 1971), American voice-over actress
Kitty (actor), Tamil actor Raja Krishnamurthy's stage name
Kitty (drummer), a member of the band Mindless Self Indulgence
Kitty (rapper), Florida hip-hop artist Kathryn Beckwith (born 1993)
Kitty Barne (1883–1961), British writer
George Kitty Bransfield (1875–1947), American baseball player
Kittie Bruneau (1929–2021), Canadian painter and printmaker
Kitty Burke, professional wrestler manager from the Gorgeous Ladies of Wrestling
Kitty Canutt, American bronc rider
 Kitty Carlisle (1910–2007), American singer, actress and television personality, born Catherine Conn
Caitlin Kitty Carruthers (born 1961), American figure skater
Kitty Cheatham (1864–1946), American singer and actress
Kitty Cooper (born 1950), American bridge player
Kittie Doswell (1939–2011), American R&B, soul and jazz vocalist
Kitty Dukakis (born 1936), wife of Massachusetts governor Michael Dukakis
Kitty Ferguson (born 1941), American science writer
Kitty Fisher (died 1767), British courtesan
Kitty Petrine Fredriksen (1910–2003), Norwegian politician
Kitty Genovese (1935–1964), American murder victim
Kitty Joyner, (1916–1993), American electrical engineer
Kitty Jutbring, (born 1977), Swedish reality television contestant, radio and television host, singer and DJ
Kitty Kallen (1921–2016), American singer
Kitty Kelley (born 1942), American writer
Kitty Kelly (1902–1968), American actress
Caroline 'Kitty' Kenney  (1880 – 1952), sister of Annie Kenney, and British suffragette hunger striker
Kitty Lange Kielland (1843–1914), Norwegian painter
Kitty Kiernan (1892–1945), Irish fiancée of Michael Collins
Kitty Leroy (1850–1877), American Old West gambler, saloon owner, prostitute and trick shooter
Kitty Margolis (born 1955), American jazz singer
Kitty McShane (1897–1964), Irish actress
Kitty O'Neil (1946–2018), American stuntwoman and racer
Kitty Pilgrim (born 1954), American journalist
Lady Kitty Spencer (born 1990), English model
Kitty Ussher (born 1971), British politician
Kitty van Haperen (born 1976), Dutch athlete
Kitty Wells (1919–2012), American country music singer
Kitty White (1923–2009), American jazz vocalist
Kitty Wilkins (1857–1936), American horse breeder
Kitty Winn (born 1944), American actress
Chicha Amatayakul,formerly Kanyawee Poomsiridol,with a nickname Kitty (born 1993),Thailand actress and ex-member of Kiss Me Five.

Fictional characters 
Kitty Carter, An 18th century prostitute in the 2017 television series Harlots
Kitty, an imaginary friend in Anne Frank's diary
Princess Ekaterina "Kitty" Alexandrovna Shcherbatskaya, in the novel Anna Karenina by Leo Tolstoy
Miss Kitty, in the television western series Gunsmoke
Kitty, in the anime series Kimba the White Lion 
Kitty (Danny Phantom), in the television series Danny Phantom
Kitty Bell, in the Sailor Moon series
Kitty Forman, in the television series That '70s Show
Kitty Foyle, the title character of the 1939 novel Kitty Foyle and the 1940 film based on the novel
Kitty Jones, in The Bartimaeus Trilogy novels by Jonathan Stroud
Kitty Katswell, in the animated television series T.U.F.F. Puppy
Kitty Keene, the title character of Kitty Keene, Inc., a 1937–1941 American radio show
Kitty Ko, in the television series Sidekick
Kitty Walker McCallister, in the television series Brothers & Sisters
Kitty Norville, the title character of a series of urban fantasy novels by Carrie Vaughn
Kitty Pryde, a superheroine from the Marvel Comics X-Men comics and films who goes by the name Shadowcat
Kitty Ricketts, in the James Joyce novel Ulysses
Kitty Sanchez, in the television series Arrested Development
Kitty Wilde, in the television series Glee
Kitty, from the television series Danger Rangers
Catherine "Kitty" Bennet, the fourth Bennet sister in Jane Austen's 1813 novel Pride and Prejudice
Kitty Edwards (née Hawkins), in the television series Mr Selfridge
Kitty, an energetic and chipper character from Total Drama Presents: The Ridonculous Race
Kitty Softpaws, a character from the animated film Puss in Boots
Hello Kitty, also known as Kitty White
Kitty Freekowtski, The name for the cat in the Tubi version of The Fabulous Furry Freak Brothers.
Kitty Cheshire, daughter of the Cheshire Cat in Ever After High

See also
Kitten (disambiguation)

English feminine given names
English given names